A spill of the leadership of the Liberal Party of Australia took place on 8 April 1982, following former Foreign Minister Andrew Peacock's dissatisfaction with the party's direction under Prime Minister Malcolm Fraser. Fraser beat Peacock's challenge for the leadership of the Liberal Party, 54 votes to 27.

Background
On 16 April 1981 Andrew Peacock suddenly resigned from the Cabinet, accusing Prime Minister Fraser of constant interference in his portfolio. This prompted much speculation that intended to challenge Fraser for the leadership.

Almost exactly a year later, after a disappointing by election defeat and days after the party's defeat in the Victorian state election (losing power after 27 years), on 5 April 1982 Peacock declared his intention to challenge Fraser, saying "The results of recent elections have shown that the Liberal Party has lost the broad community support which it requires to govern effectively.".

The day before the spill Deputy Leader Phillip Lynch announced his resignation stating that "I believe that this is the time to seek the talents of a younger man for the position." This prompted talk of a ticket of Peacock for Leader and Treasurer John Howard for Deputy

Candidates
 Malcolm Fraser, incumbent Leader, Prime Minister of Australia, Member for Wannon
 Andrew Peacock, former Minister for Industrial Relations, Member for Kooyong

Results

The following tables gives the ballot results:

Leadership ballot

Deputy leadership ballot

Aftermath
Following his victory Fraser returned Peacock to the Cabinet, replacing the retiring Lynch. It was however not enough to maintain his prime ministership for long, 11 months later he lost a snap federal election to Bob Hawke's Labor Party and resigned, leaving Peacock to take the leadership.

References

Liberal Party of Australia leadership spills
Liberal Party of Australia leadership spill